The  long Naoli River flows through Heilongjiang Province in northeast China and is the longest tributary to the river Ussuri.

Notes

Rivers of Heilongjiang
Tributaries of the Ussuri